Jon James Lamont Whiteley (19 February 1945 – 16 May 2020) was a Scottish child film actor and in adult life a distinguished art historian.

Life and career
The Monymusk-born Whiteley appeared in five films during his brief acting career, and it was for the second of these, The Kidnappers (US: The Little Kidnappers, 1953), that he, along with co-star Vincent Winter, was awarded an Academy Juvenile Award. He appeared in only three more films, including The Spanish Gardener (1956), before his film acting career was effectively put on hold when his mother insisted on him passing the Eleven plus exam. After appearing twice more for TV credits, his acting career ended. 

Whiteley was educated at Pembroke College, Oxford, whereafter he became a respected art historian at the Ashmolean Museum in Oxford. He wrote his doctorate on the revival in painting of themes inspired by antiquity in mid-nineteenth-century France. He catalogued all the French Drawings in the Ashmolean, and authored and co-authored several books on artists including Ingres, Puvis de Chavannes and Claude Lorrain. He published a book on the Ashmolean's Stringed Instruments in 2009, and was working on a catalogue of the later French paintings in the Museum.

His wife was art historian Linda Whiteley; the couple had two children. He was made a chevalier (knight) of the French Order of Arts and Letters in May 2009. The cause of his death was Glioblastoma (also known as glioblastoma multiforme or GBM). This is the most aggressive type of cancerous brain tumour in adults. The date or location of his funeral is not known. He is buried in Botley cemetery, Oxford.

Filmography

Works

References

External links

1945 births
2020 deaths
Scottish male film actors
Scottish male child actors
British art historians
Academy Juvenile Award winners
Chevaliers of the Ordre des Arts et des Lettres
People associated with the Ashmolean Museum
20th-century British historians
20th-century British male writers
21st-century British historians
21st-century British male writers